Puntila is a 1959 opera by Paul Dessau 1956–1959, to a libretto by Peter Palitzsch and Manfred Wekwerth after the play Mr Puntila and his Man Matti by Brecht. It was premiered 15 November 1966.

Recording
Puntila - Reiner Süss, Kurt Rehm, Irmgard Arnold, Erich Witte, Gertrud Stilo, Hannerose Katterfield, dir Paul Dessau Staatskapelle Berlin & Chor des Deutschen Staatsoper Berlin  1969  5 139 280~81 SLPM (2 LP box)

References

Operas by Paul Dessau
German-language operas
Operas
1959 operas
Operas based on plays